JEF Norway (Europeisk Ungdom, literally European Youth) is the Norwegian chapter of Young European Federalists. It has 1,300 members, and consists of the national board (landsstyret), the executive board (sentralstyret), regional chapters (for instance in Oslo, Akershus etc.) and local chapters.

History

The organization was founded in 1973, after the first Norwegian European Communities membership referendum in 1972. Before the official establishment named organization Interim Board of the European Movement Youth.

The organization was central to the Norwegian EU campaign in 1994. In the early 1990s, the European Youth one of the largest youth organizations with nearly 10 000 members.

Structure
European Youth headed by Knut André Sande (2017 d.d.) from Sandnes. General Secretary is Ingeborg Helene Vasrud Bastiansen (2018 -d.d.). The rest of the executive committee consisting of 1st Vice Chairman Stephen Jørstad and 2nd Deputy Sarah Frost Logan.

Young European regional organization in most Norwegian counties and local groups in some 20 of the largest municipalities in the country. The organizational center of gravity is located in the major cities: Oslo, Bergen, Stavanger, Trondheim and Tromsø.

The National Executive Committee is the highest permanent organ of the European Youth, bypassing congress every other autumn. Authority consists of the central executive, five directly elected representatives elected by the congress, and one representative from each county. Central Board is responsible for the daily operations. The secretariat consists of two people: chairman and secretary general.

The organization has about 1,400 registered members (2019). Members are often associated with other youth and Norwegian youth parties such as Young Conservatives, AUF and Young Liberals. The average age is around 20 years.

Eurofederalism
Youth organisations based in Norway
Political organisations based in Norway